Trzęsiny  is a village in the administrative district of Gmina Radecznica, within Zamość County, Lublin Voivodeship, in eastern Poland. According to the 2011 census, the village has a population of 104 people.

References

Villages in Zamość County